The Jaugila is a river of  Kėdainiai district municipality, Kaunas County, central Lithuania. It is a left tributary of the Smilga.

There is Urnėžiai dam and pond over the Jaugila river.

References

Rivers of Lithuania
Kėdainiai District Municipality